Gastrochilus pseudodistichus is a species of orchid. It is native to Asia (Nepal, Yunnan, Assam, Bhutan, Thailand, Vietnam and Taiwan].

References 

pseudodistichus
Orchids of China
Orchids of Thailand
Orchids of India
Orchids of Nepal
Orchids of Vietnam
Flora of Assam (region)
Flora of East Himalaya
Plants described in 1895